Rebecca R. DerSimonian is an American statistician, known for her work with Nan Laird introducing the random-effects model for meta-analysis and, in their 1986 paper "Meta-analysis in clinical trials" applying meta-analysis to clinical trials. She is a biostatistician in the National Institutes of Health.

DerSimonian graduated in 1974 from Brandeis University, and earned a Ph.D. in 1983 at Harvard University.
At the National Institutes of Health, she has also been active in supporting women researchers, as a member of its Women Scientist Advisors Committee and as an organizer of communications workshops for women.

In 1988, as an assistant professor at Yale University, and again in 1993–1994, as a researcher with the National Institutes of Health, she visited Armenia for four months each as a Fulbright Scholar. In 2017 she was elected as a Fellow of the American Statistical Association.

References

External links

Year of birth missing (living people)
Living people
American statisticians
Women statisticians
Biostatisticians
Brandeis University alumni
Harvard School of Public Health alumni
Yale University faculty
National Institutes of Health people
Fellows of the American Statistical Association